Southwestern High School is located in Hanover, Indiana.

History
Southwestern High School was founded in 1960 with the consolidation of Saluda and Hanover high schools. Since the two schools were located in the southwestern region of Jefferson County, Indiana, the school was officially named Southwestern Jefferson County Consolidated High School. Originally, the school was located in the edifice of the old Hanover High School. However, the old school was severely damaged in the April 3, 1974, tornado Super Outbreak that ravaged much of the Midwest. The current building was built over the following year.

See also
 List of high schools in Indiana

References

External links
 Southwestern Jefferson County Schools

Public high schools in Indiana
Schools in Jefferson County, Indiana
Public middle schools in Indiana
1960 establishments in Indiana